Château de Vaugoubert is a château in Quinsac, Dordogne, Nouvelle-Aquitaine, France. It was declared a monument historique in 1948.

Châteaux in Dordogne
Monuments historiques of Dordogne